The psychological schools are the great classical theories of psychology. Each has been highly influential; however, most psychologists hold eclectic viewpoints that combine aspects of each school.

Most influential  ones
The most influential ones and its main founders are: 
 Behaviorism: Watson
 Cognitivism: Aaron T. Beck, Albert Ellis
 Functionalism: William James
 Humanistic/Gestalt: Carl Rogers
 Psychoanalytic school: Sigmund Freud  
 Systems psychology: Gregory Bateson, Felix Guattari

Complete list
The list below includes all these, and other, influential schools of thought in psychology:

 Activity-oriented approach
 Analytical psychology
 Anti-psychiatry
 Anomalistic psychology
 Associationism
 Behaviorism (see also radical behaviorism)
 Behavioural genetics
 Bioenergetics
 Biological psychology
 Biopsychosocial model
 Cognitivism
 Cultural-historical psychology
 Depth psychology
 Descriptive psychology
 Developmental psychology
 Ecopsychology
 Ecological psychology
 Ecological systems theory
 Ego psychology
 Environmental psychology
 Evolutionary psychology
 Existential psychology
 Experimental analysis of behavior - the school descended from B.F. Skinner's work.
 Functionalism
 Gestalt psychology
 Gestalt therapy
 Humanistic psychology
 Individual psychology
 Industrial psychology
 Liberation psychology
 Logotherapy 
 Organismic psychology
 Organizational psychology
 Phenomenological psychology
 Process psychology
 Psychoanalysis
 Psychohistory
 Radical behaviorism - often considered a school of philosophy, not psychology.
 Psychology of self
 Social psychology (sociocultural psychology)
 Strength-based practice
 Structuralism
 Systems psychology
 Transactional analysis
 Transpersonal psychology

See also 
 History of psychology

Schools, list of